TVG may refer to:

Televisión de Galicia, a Galician television channel; part of the Compañía de Radio Televisión de Galicia, in Spain
Time-varied gain
TV-G, a content rating in the American TV Parental Guidelines
TVG Network, the former name of the American horse racing television network now known as FanDuel TV
TVG, the United States Navy's signal code for "Well done" until 1949, when they adopted the international naval signal BZ (Bravo Zulu)
TV Gopalakrishnan, Indian singer and mridangam player

See also
TVGN